Bismoclite is a bismuth oxohalide mineral with formula BiOCl. It is the naturally occurring form of bismuth oxychloride. The name was derived from its chemical constituents. It is a secondary bismuth mineral first thought to be composed of bismuthyl ions (BiO+) and chloride anions, however, the existence of the diatomic bismuthyl ion is doubtful.
It is a member of the matlockite group.

It was first described in 1935 from alluvium near bismuth-bearing pegmatites in South Africa.  It has been found in association with granite pegmatite and in greisen. Associated minerals include bismutite, mica, jarosite, alunite, cerussite, atacamite, connellite. Occurrences include the type locality at Jackals Water, SW of Prieska, South Africa; Bygoo, Australia; the Tintic district in the East Tintic Mountains of Utah; and from Dalbeattie, Scotland.

Crystal structure 
The crystal structure of bismoclite was found to be composed of linked decahedrons, specifically a square antiprism. These decahedrons consist of 2 squares with sides of 3.487 Å (O-O-O-O and Cl-Cl-Cl-Cl) connected by 8 isosceles triangles (O-Cl-O and Cl-O-Cl), with a bismuth atom at the centre. The Bi-O distances and Bi-Cl distances are 2.316 Å and 3.059 Å, respectively. The O-Cl distances in the triangles are 3.249 Å. The decahedrons are linked to each other through shared O-Cl sides.

References

Bismuth minerals
Oxide minerals
Halide minerals
Tetragonal minerals
Minerals in space group 129